Braunig is a German language surname. It stems from the male given name Bruno – and may refer to:
Sascha Braunig (1983), Canadian painter
Werner Bräunig (1934–1976), German author

References 

German-language surnames
Surnames from given names